Bernhard Zgoll (25 June 1927 as Bernard Jan Zgol– August 2002) was a Polish–German professional football manager. He is the second youngest trainer in the history of Ekstraklasa (21 years old in 1949).

Career
Zgol coached two top Polish league teams: Szombierki Bytom and Górnik Radlin. In 1950, 1955 nad 1957 he fell with his team to the second division, in 1956 he was promoted to the first division. In 1958, a Polish military court sentenced him to 10 years in prison for collaborating with American intelligence.

Zgol in 1970 arrived for Germany and changed the spelling of his surname. Next in 1978 in the Philippine to oversee the setting up of eight football centres in sites nationwide. These centres would be where young football hopefuls under the age of 18 could be nurtured and developed until they rose from the ranks and played for the national team.

In 1983, he served as a technical advisor in Korea Football Association

In 1984, he was a head coach of the Kenya national football team. In 1992, he coached the Dominican Republic national football team. He was friends with Rudi Gutendorf.

References

Polish football managers
German football managers
Expatriate football managers in Kenya
Kenya national football team managers
Expatriate football managers in the Dominican Republic
Dominican Republic national football team managers
Place of birth missing
1927 births
2002 deaths